Sadie Harris, M.D. is a fictional character from the American television medical drama Grey's Anatomy, which airs on the American Broadcasting Company (ABC) in the United States. The character was created by series producer Shonda Rhimes and portrayed by actress Melissa George. Introduced as a surgical intern who has an old companionship with the series' protagonist Meredith Grey (Ellen Pompeo), she eventually forms a friendship with Lexie Grey (Chyler Leigh), and departs after it is revealed she cheated her way into the surgical program.

George was invited to meet with Grey's Anatomy executive producers after the show's casting agents saw her in the 2008 television drama, In Treatment. The actress' original contract included 8 to 11 episodes of recurring appearances in season 5, with the possibility of becoming a series regular. She was originally planned to be a romantic foil for Callie Torres (Sara Ramirez) and Erica Hahn (Brooke Smith), but the role was retooled after the latter departed in November 2008.

After speculation as to whether the character would become a series-regular, it was confirmed that George's character would not be joining the series and would soon depart. George explained that it was her own decision to leave the show, in response to the assertions that her departure was done to "de-gay" Grey's Anatomy. The character has received mixed feedback from critics, and has been characterized as "naughty", "mischievous", and "nutty".

Storylines
Sadie Harris first appears in the season 5 episode "These Ties That Bind", in which it is made known that she was once a very close friend of Meredith Grey      (Ellen Pompeo). Harris and Meredith Grey had given each other nicknames during an extended vacation in Europe: "Die" and "Death", respectively. Meredith Grey's best friend is Cristina Yang (Sandra Oh); Yang becomes jealous of the friendship between Meredith Grey and Harris. Having joined Seattle Grace Hospital as a surgical intern, Harris begins a friendship with fellow intern Lexie Grey (Chyler Leigh), Meredith Grey's sister. The hospital's interns are frustrated with their lack of surgical opportunities, so Harris cuts her own shoulder and then lets the interns stitch it back together.

Harris later volunteers herself to have an appendectomy to help the interns learn that surgical procedure, on the condition that she gets a chance to perform one afterwards. The interns make a mistake in the surgery, and Harris is seriously endangered, but is rescued by the residents. The interns are put on probation and rebuked by Meredith Grey, although Harris tells Lexie Grey that she is not apologetic. Following the surgery fiasco, Harris approaches the hospital's chief of surgery Richard Webber (James Pickens, Jr.), and claims responsibility for the incident. He informs her that the reason she has not been fired is because of his personal friendship with her father.

Later, she flirts with Callie Torres (Sara Ramirez), although the relationship is never pursued. Harris continues to pursue a friendship with Lexie Grey, even going as far as to help her cover up Lexie Grey's blooming relationship with Mark Sloan (Eric Dane). In "Before and After", during a competition among the interns set up by Izzie Stevens (Katherine Heigl), George O'Malley (T. R. Knight) notices Harris' lack of medical knowledge. Although he offers to tutor Harris, she declines and chooses not to tell Webber, which O'Malley does instead. When Harris comes out from a talk with Webber, she tells Meredith Grey that she has decided to quit, and that she did not qualify for the surgical program. When she tries to get Meredith Grey to go back to vacationing in Europe, Meredith Grey declines and Harris departs.

Development

Casting and creation
Melissa George received an invitation to meet the show's executive producers, Shonda Rhimes and Betsy Beers, from Grey's Anatomy casting agents after they saw her recurring guest performances in the television drama In Treatment (2008). George explained that after meeting with the producers, she was set to begin working.

George's initial contract included eight to eleven episodes of recurring appearances, with the possibility of becoming a series-regular. However, according to George's representative, she did not intend to do more than 8 episodes. Harris was first planned to have a romance with Torres, but Rhimes eventually changed that after George started filming. She was initially written as a lesbian, but was revised as bisexual.

In January 2009, George confirmed her departure from Grey's Anatomy, and several reasons were cited for her leaving. George said she had decided to leave to pursue another project, and offered praise to the cast members. However, a representative of the show claimed the actress' departure was due to a mutual agreement between Grey's Anatomy and George, explaining that the character's storyline "came to a natural end", but that everyone was upset with her departure. Following Erica Hahn (Brooke Smith)'s departure, E! Online Kristin Dos Santos asserted that Smith's dismissal from the show, and the rewrite of Harris' storyline, was enforced by the American Broadcasting Company (ABC), as part of an attempt to "de-gay" Grey's Anatomy, but these claims were rebuked by Rhimes.

Characterization

George's character has been described as "naughty" and "mischievous", as well as "nutty". She added that Harris' sexuality is not the main aspect of her personality. George called her character "broken", and opined that her outgoing personality is meant to cover up something else. George stated that the way she portrayed Harris was influenced by the outspokenness of Lisa Rowe, a sociopathic character from Girl, Interrupted (1999) played by Angelina Jolie.

Peter Nowalk, one of the show's writers, characterized Harris as "quite a flirty gal". Other Grey's Anatomy cast members have also commented on the character of Harris; Chandra Wilson stated that Harris is fast-paced, whereas Leigh said that the character is there to "wreak havoc on Seattle Grace". Entertainment Weekly Michael Ausiello said that Harris is "an intern with an open mind towards sexuality".

Debbie Chang, writing for BuddyTV, and Jonathan Toomey of The Huffington Post also cast ideas about Harris' self-incision in the episode "In The Midnight Hour", wondering if she "has a death wish" and "what is wrong with her". Stacy McKee, a primary writer for the show, said Harris is Meredith Grey's "pre-Cristina Cristina" and that she shares "a history with Meredith that Cristina can't".

Reception

Throughout her run on Grey's Anatomy, the character received mixed feedback among critics. 

Jon Caramanica of the Los Angeles Times was critical of her character development, calling George "woefully misused". Writing for The Age, Michael Idato opined that the storyline between Harris and Yang was "frosty", adding that the writing was in a "true soap fashion".

Darren Devlyn of the Herald Sun wondered if the producers brought in George to "shake up the show", and found the character's bisexual storyline similar to Hahn's. Speaking of George's exit, Kris De Leon of BuddyTV noted that she departed on the "best of terms" in comparison with Isaiah Washington (Preston Burke), Smith, and Knight—former cast members who had "rocky" exits.

Erin McWhirter of The Daily Telegraph called George's character "outrageous" in response to the appendectomy. Former Star-Ledger editor Alan Sepinwall was critical of the character, saying he rolled his eyes in regard to her letting the interns perform procedures on her, sarcastically writing: "Ooooh, she's damaged! And sexy! She takes off her top and then eagerly cuts herself for the other interns! That's hot!" TV Guide Erin Lulevitch referred to her as a "masochist" due to her self-incision.

Scott Ellis of The Sydney Morning Herald enjoyed the character, calling her "intriguing". Entertainment Weekly Jennifer Armstrong enjoyed Harris in "Sympathy For The Devil", finding it "sweet" when she took the blame for causing Sloan's penile fracture, to avoid Lexie Grey being embarrassed. Chang of BuddyTV claimed that Harris is "kind of a rebel", and the Daily News Lauren Johnston deemed her personality "brash".

References

External links

Fictional characters from Seattle
Television characters introduced in 2008
Fictional surgeons
Grey's Anatomy characters
Female characters in television
Fictional female doctors